The James W. Barney Pickaweekee Story Grove features a series of six bronze sculptures by Jack Greaves, installed in Columbus, Ohio's Battelle Riverfront Park, in the United States. The artworks were completed in 1992 for the Christopher Columbus Quincentenary Jubilee celebrations. The grove is named after Jim Barney, who served as director of the Columbus Recreation and Parks Department, and the sculptures were relocated to their current location in 2015.

The figures, sometimes collectively referred to as Children's Fountain, KidSpeak Children's Fountain, or Pickaweekee Children's Fountain, include Eagle, Griffin, Hound, Lion, Owl, and Unicorn.

The sculptures were designed for a children's park, located just south of the Joseph P. Kinneary U.S. Courthouse. The park was themed after S. J. Seaburn's mythical story, "Pickaweekee, A Myth of Discovery", with a set of trees representing an enchanted forest, among a fountain, waterfall, and meandering stream. During the Scioto Mile renovations, the space was redesigned, and the statues were moved a short distance northwest, to their current place. The Scioto River and a nearby young tree stand in for the story in the present day.

The group's owl sculpture, valued at $35,250, was stolen in 2009.

See also

 1992 in art
 List of public art in Columbus, Ohio

References

1992 establishments in Ohio
1992 sculptures
Animal sculptures in the United States
Bronze sculptures in Ohio
Dogs in art
Downtown Columbus, Ohio
Griffins
Lions in art
Outdoor sculptures in Ohio
Relocated buildings and structures in Ohio
Sculptures of birds in the United States
Statues in Columbus, Ohio
Works about unicorns